1967–1970, also known as the Blue Album, is a compilation album of songs by the English rock band the Beatles, spanning the years indicated in the title. A double LP, it was released with 1962–1966 (the "Red Album") in April 1973. 1967–1970 topped the Billboard albums chart in the United States and peaked at number 2 on the UK Albums Chart. It was re-released in September 1993 on CD, charting at number 4 in the United Kingdom.

The album was instigated by Apple Records manager Allen Klein during his final months before being dismissed from that position. As with 1962–1966, the compilation was created by Apple and EMI/Capitol Records in response to a bootleg collection titled Alpha Omega, which had been sold on television the previous year. Print advertising for the two records made a point of declaring them "the only  collection of the Beatles". The success of the two official double LP compilations inspired Capitol's repackaging of the Beach Boys' 1960s hits, starting with the 1974 album Endless Summer.

Album covers 
For the group's 1963 debut LP Please Please Me, photographer Angus McBean took the distinctive colour photograph of the group looking down over the stairwell inside EMI House (EMI's London headquarters in Manchester Square, demolished in 1995).

In 1969, the Beatles asked McBean to recreate this shot. Although a photograph from the 1969 photo shoot was originally intended for the then-planned Get Back album, it was not used when that project saw eventual release in 1970 as Let It Be. Instead, another photograph from the 1969 shoot, along with an unused photograph from the 1963 photo shoot, was used for both this LP and 1962–1966.

The inner gatefold photo for both LPs is by Don McCullin from the "Mad Day Out" photo session in London on Sunday 28 July 1968.

The album cover was designed by Tom Wilkes.

International versions
Unlike the 1962–1966 collection, the Blue Album was largely the same in the U.S. and the UK, although there were some variations.

The U.S. edition had "Strawberry Fields Forever" in its original 1967 stereo mix while both "Penny Lane" and "Hello, Goodbye" were presented in fake stereo, and "I Am the Walrus" with a four-beat electric piano introduction; the UK version had the more common six-beat beginning.

The albums had several other variants and anomalies. "Get Back" was described as the album version in the U.S. liner notes, although it was in fact the single version. In both countries, "Hey Jude" was around nine seconds shorter than it had been on the original single, although the full length was restored for the 1993 compact disc edition.

The original vinyl version faded in during the crowd noise at the beginning of "A Day in the Life". The fade in was different on both the UK and U.S. versions. The original compact disc edition, meanwhile, featured a clean version previously heard on the Imagine: John Lennon soundtrack album in 1988.

In the Spanish edition "One After 909" replaced "The Ballad of John and Yoko", a song that had been banned from the airwaves shortly after being released as a single in 1969, for its allusions to "Christ" and "Gibraltar" in the lyrics.

Release variations 
 Original 1973 UK release: Apple PCSP 7181-2
 Original 1973 US release: Apple SKBO-3404 (whole and sliced apples in blue background)
 Second 1976 US pressing: Capitol SKBO-3404 (Capitol target label on back of album cover, blue label with "Capitol" in light blue letters at bottom)
 1978 first US blue vinyl release: Capitol SEBX-11843 (Capitol dome label on back of album cover, large dome logo at top of light blue labels)
 1980 East German release. Amiga 8 55 742. One disc only with 14 tracks, mostly from disc 1 of the original version.
 1993 CD release. Apple 0777 7 97039 2 0 (whole and sliced apples in blue background)
 2010 remastered CD release. Apple 5099990674723 (whole and sliced apples in blue background)

Track listing 
 The single versions of "Get Back" and  "Let It Be" make their album debut in this compilation.
 All tracks written by John Lennon and Paul McCartney except where noted.

Charts

Weekly charts

Original release

1993 reissue

2010 reissue

Year-end charts

Certifications and sales 

In the US, the album sold 1,294,896 LPs by 31 December 1973 and 5,850,026 LPs by the end of the decade.

See also 
 List of best-selling albums in Austria
 List of best-selling albums in France
 List of best-selling albums in Germany
 List of best-selling albums in the United States
 List of diamond-certified albums in Canada

References

External links 
 Notes on releases

Albums produced by George Martin
Albums produced by Phil Spector
The Beatles compilation albums
Apple Records compilation albums
Albums arranged by George Martin
Albums arranged by Paul McCartney
Albums conducted by Paul McCartney
Albums conducted by George Martin
Albums arranged by John Lennon
Albums recorded at Trident Studios
Albums recorded at Apple Studios
1973 compilation albums
Albums recorded at Olympic Sound Studios